Darrell Asberry (born February 12, 1972) is an American former college football coach. He served as head football coach at Shaw University from 2006 to 2011 and Texas Southern University from 2012 to 2015, compiling a career coaching record of 51–57.

Head coaching record

References

External links
 Texas Southern profile

1972 births
Living people
American football quarterbacks
Jackson State Tigers football coaches
Jackson State Tigers football players
Coahoma Tigers football coaches
North Carolina Central Eagles football coaches
Shaw Bears football coaches
Texas Southern Tigers football coaches
Players of American football from Baton Rouge, Louisiana
African-American coaches of American football
African-American players of American football
20th-century African-American sportspeople
21st-century African-American sportspeople